Julius Porcellis (1610/19 – buried 30 September 1645) was a Dutch marine artist.

Porcellis was born in Rotterdam, the son of the marine artist Jan Porcellis, and a follower of him in artistic terms - their choice of subjects was similar and their signature monogram the same, but Julius's palette (often distinctively creamy, with vivid colours late in his career in an even greater departure from Jan's tonal style) is agreed to be less subtle, and his style and sense of space less fluent. He was born in Rotterdam and died in Leiden.

References

External links
National Maritime Museum biography of Jan and Julius Porcellis

1610s births
1645 deaths
Dutch Golden Age painters
Dutch male painters
Dutch marine artists
Painters from Rotterdam